The 2012–13 Texas A&M Aggies men's basketball team represents the Texas A&M University in the 2012–13 college basketball season. The team's head coach is Billy Kennedy, who is in his second season at Texas A&M. The team plays their home games at the Reed Arena in College Station, Texas and will play in its first season as a member of the Southeastern Conference. On 21 December 2012, Forward Keith Davis left the team.

Previous season
The Aggies posted a record of 14–18 (4-14 Big XII) in the 2011–12 season and finished ninth in their last full season as a member of the Big XII. The season was particularly troubling for Head Coach Kennedy, who was diagnosed prior to the beginning of the season with Parkinson's Disease. The Aggies missed the NCAA Tournament for the first time in six seasons.

Roster

Schedule

|-
!colspan=12| Exhibition

|-
!colspan=12| Non-Conference Regular Season

|-
!colspan=12| SEC Regular Season

|-
!colspan=12| 2013 SEC tournament

|-
| colspan="12" | *Non-Conference Game. Rankings from AP poll. All times are in Central Time.
|}

References

Texas AandM
Texas A&M Aggies men's basketball seasons